Devine is an unincorporated community in Pueblo County, in the U.S. state of Colorado.

The community was named after Thomas Devine, a railroad official.

References

Unincorporated communities in Pueblo County, Colorado
Unincorporated communities in Colorado